Angel Mage is a 2019 young adult science fiction novel by Garth Nix.

Synopsis 
The setting of the book is one in which humans are able to call upon angels using magical icons. Lilliath, an evil mage, once unleashed a horrific curse upon the kingdom of Istara. After her return 140 years later, four young people, Simon, Agnez, Henri and Dorotea, must work together to stop her from achieving her goals.

Reception 
The book was praised by critics, particularly for its unique system of magic, and its blending of high and low fantasy. Bruce Hale of the New York Journal of Books described it as a "rollicking blend of horror story, adventure, and fantasy".

In a review for Locus, Carolyn Cushman and Amy Goldschlager noted the book's many references to Alexandre Dumas' The Three Musketeers. The book has also been noted for its fully fleshed characters, and prominent representation of racial and sexual diversity.

The book received the 2019 Aurealis Award for Best Science Fiction Novel.

References 

2019 science fiction novels
Young adult books
2019 Australian novels
Science fantasy novels
Australian science fiction novels
Australian fantasy novels
Aurealis Award-winning works